"Creature Comfort" is a song by Canadian indie rock band Arcade Fire. It was released on June 16, 2017, as the second single from the band's fifth studio album, Everything Now. The song was co-produced by Portishead's Geoff Barrow and Pulp bassist Steve Mackey.

Music video
The "Creature Comfort" music video was directed by Tarik Mikou. The video depicts the members of Arcade Fire wearing shiny golden suits performing in a plainly decorated room as a strobe light flashes intermittently. The song's lyrics scroll via a ticker with the lead vocals at the bottom and the backing vocals at the top. Stephen Thompson of NPR interpreted the video as complementing the band's narrative on the album: "unrealistic expectations, pressure to conform, and the exhausting din of modern life."

Promotion and release
Arcade Fire first performed "Creature Comfort" on June 1, 2017, at the Primavera Sound festival in Barcelona. On June 14, Arcade Fire posted a teaser for the studio version of the song on their Facebook page. The clip took the form of a mock advertisement for a 100% marshmallow breakfast cereal that contains methylphenidate, or Ritalin, and ended with a warning that the marshmallows "are not approved for consumption in the United States and Canada". The band also revealed that they had distributed Creature Comfort cereal boxes at several locations around Dublin. Fans who found the cereal received entry to an afterparty at Whelan's that night following the band's performance at Malahide Castle. "Creature Comfort" was released as a download on June 16, 2017 on streaming and digital media services.

Reception
The song received critical acclaim from critics and fans upon release, many noted its moving lyrics and tight instrumentation. Elias Leight of Rolling Stone likened the song to The Human League's "Seconds" and The Knife's "Heartbeats" and wrote: "Underneath the curtain of synthesizers, ringing power chords, pulverizing drums and cheerfully shouted backing vocals, lead singer Win Butler tells a grim tale about cultural pressures that lead men and women to hate themselves." In reviews for the song in The Independent, Jacob Stolworthy said the track "signals that Arcade Fire's best days may not be behind them", and Christopher Hooton remarked, "It's the kind of song where you don't know whether to cry or dance, and that's probably the best kind." Jeremy Gordon of Spin described the synthesizer that sets the song's tempo as "the sonic realization of the band's decade-old dream about the dark mystery of the city." Pitchfork's Jillian Mapes said that while the song "will stop someone from doing something rash ... Arcade Fire are pompous about knowing that, throwing their arms wide around the problem and presenting their own music as the solution."

Credits and personnel

Arcade Fire
Win Butler – vocals, electric guitar
Régine Chassagne – vocals, keytar
Richard Reed Parry – electric guitar, backing vocals
William Butler – keyboards, backing vocals
Tim Kingsbury – bass guitar, backing vocals
Jeremy Gara – drums

Additional musicians
Geoff Barrow – synthesizer
Akia Nevills – vocals
Tracci Lee – vocals
Kayla Jasmine – vocals
Jelly Joseph – vocals

Recording personnel
Geoff Barrow – production
Steve Mackey – production
Arcade Fire – production
Iain Berryman – engineering
Korey Richey – engineering
Mark Lawson – engineering
Eric Heigle – engineering
Max Prior – assistant engineering
Craig Silvey – mixing
Greg Calbi – mastering

Charts

Certifications

References

2017 singles
2017 songs
Arcade Fire songs
Columbia Records singles
Song recordings produced by Steve Mackey
Songs about suicide
Songs written by William Butler (musician)
Songs written by Win Butler
Songs written by Régine Chassagne
Songs written by Jeremy Gara
Songs written by Tim Kingsbury
Songs written by Richard Reed Parry